Długołęka may refer to the following places in Poland:
Długołęka, Lower Silesian Voivodeship (south-west Poland)
Długołęka, Podlaskie Voivodeship (north-east Poland)
Długołęka, Łódź Voivodeship (central Poland)
Długołęka, Świętokrzyskie Voivodeship (south-central Poland)
Długołęka, Masovian Voivodeship (east-central Poland)
Długołęka, Greater Poland Voivodeship (west-central Poland)
Długołęka, Warmian-Masurian Voivodeship (north Poland)
Długołęka, West Pomeranian Voivodeship (north-west Poland)